Michael Manning may refer to:
Michael Manning (priest) (1940s–2016), Roman Catholic priest
Michael Manning (murderer) (1929–1954), last person to be executed in the Republic of Ireland
Michael Manning (fetish artist) (born 1963), fetish artist based in Los Angeles, California
Mick Manning (born 1959), children's author and illustrator
Michael J. Manning (1943–2008), activist/economist
Mike Manning (actor) (born 1987), American reality television personality and actor